Michael Joseph Kearns, Sr. (June 18, 1929  – January 31, 2009) was an American professional basketball player. Kearns was selected in the 1951 NBA draft by the Philadelphia Warriors after a collegiate career at Princeton. He played for the Warriors in only six games during the second half of the 1954–55 season. Kearns scored one point, grabbed three rebounds and dished out five assists in his entire NBA career.

Born and raised in Trenton, New Jersey, Kearns played high school basketball at Trenton Central High School.

References

External links
Mike Kearns' obituary

1929 births
2009 deaths
American men's basketball players
Basketball players from Trenton, New Jersey
People from Hamilton Township, Mercer County, New Jersey
Philadelphia Warriors draft picks
Philadelphia Warriors players
Point guards
Princeton Tigers men's basketball players
Trenton Central High School alumni